Bishop Gorman High School (also commonly referred to as Gorman High School or BGHS) is a private Roman Catholic preparatory school located in Las Vegas, Nevada. The school is administered by the Diocese of Las Vegas. The school opened in 1954. Its mascot is a Gael, a mounted Irish Knight.

History

Bishop Gorman High School opened its doors on September 7, 1954. Bishop Dwyer named it after his predecessor, Thomas Kiely Gorman, the first Catholic Bishop of the Reno-Las Vegas Diocese.

The campus was originally located near Downtown Las Vegas, at 1801 S. Maryland Pkwy. Classes began at its current Summerlin location on September 5, 2007.

Extracurricular activities

Athletics
The athletics program and teams of Bishop Gorman are known as the Gaels, and compete in the Southwest Division of the Sunset 4A Region. The Gaels have been described by USA Today and Sports Illustrated as being among the top thousand high school athletic programs in the United States.

In the summer of 2008, the Gaels baseball team, sponsored by American Legion Post 76 in Las Vegas, won the American Legion World Series, a first for any Nevada high school. They ended up fielding 798 points total in football, more than any other high school in the nation for the 2009 season and ended up being ranked 46th in the nation by Rivals.

Coach Tony Sanchez took over as Bishop Gorman High School's head football coach in March 2009. In 2010 and 2011, he led Gorman to a varsity record of 28-2 and an overall program record of 61-4. At the start of the 2012 season, Gorman beat nationally ranked teams Our Lady of Good Counsel in Maryland and St. Louis High School in Hawaii to raise its high school ranking into the top ten schools.  Both matches were televised, by ESPN and Fox networks, respectively. In 2014 and 2015, Bishop Gorman won back-to-back National Championships. Sanchez then left the program to coach at the collegiate level.

Former D1 wrestler, 3rd degree black belt in Gracie Brazilian Jiu-Jitsu, 3 time Team USA member, 5 time world grappling champ (152-5 overall, 78-0 FILA Int), and head strategist coach for MMA, Ricky Lundell is the current head wrestling coach for the Gaels, along with his assistant coach Todd Prace.

Notable alumni

 Rosco Allen, collegiate and professional basketball player
 Tommy Armour III, former PGA Tour golfer, currently on Champions Tour
 Jillian Bell, comedian and actress
 Tristan Blackmon, professional soccer player for Los Angeles FC
 Charisma Carpenter, actress
 Ben Carter (born 1994), American-Israeli basketball player in the Israel Basketball Premier League
 Taylor Cole (baseball), MLB pitcher for the Los Angeles Angels
 Zach Collins, basketball player, first-round selection in 2017 NBA draft
 Marty Cordova, former MLB outfielder
 Justin Crawford, professional baseball player for the Philadelphia Phillies
 Vashti Cunningham,  High School Record & Olympic High Jump Finalist
 Bison Dele, former NBA basketball player.
 Anthony DiMaria, director and actor
 Blake Ezor, former NFL player
 Frank Fertitta and Lorenzo Fertitta, owners of Station Casinos, as well as former owners of UFC
 Johnny Field, MLB outfielder for the Tampa Bay Rays
 Charvez Foger, football running back
 Ozzie Fumo, state representative
 Joey Gallo, MLB outfielder for the Los Angeles Dodgers
 Nick Gates, NFL player New York Giants
 Noah Gragson, NASCAR Driver
 Xavier Grimble, tight end for NFL's Pittsburgh Steelers
 David Humm, two-time Super Bowl champion (Oakland and Los Angeles Raiders) and Nebraska quarterback
 Joe Kristosik, former collegiate American football player
 Orr Leumi (born 1996), Israeli professional basketball player
 Johnathan Loyd, collegiate American football player, collegiate and professional basketball player
 Alizé Mack, collegiate and professional American football player
Tate Martell, former collegiate football player
 Rosie Mercado, plus-size model
 Demetris Morant, professional basketball player
 DeMarco Murray, former NFL running back for the Dallas Cowboys
 Charles O'Bannon Jr., collegiate basketball player
 Matt Othick, a retired professional basketball player, independent film producer, and restaurateur
 Inbee Park, South Korean professional golfer on the LPGA Tour and LPGA of Japan Tour.
 Joey Rickard, MLB outfielder for the Baltimore Orioles
 Donn Roach, former MLB pitcher
 Ryan Ross, founding member and former guitarist of Panic! at the Disco and lead singer of The Young Veins
 Grey Ruegamer, former NFL center, two-time Super Bowl champion and currently Director of Player Engagement of the Green Bay Packers
 Paul Sewald, MLB pitcher for the Seattle Mariners
 Spencer Smith, founding member and former drummer of Panic! at the Disco
 Ronnie Stanley, Baltimore Ravens offensive tackle
 Danny Tarkanian, businessman, attorney, and perennial candidate for elective office
 Tyler Wagner, MLB pitcher for the Milwaukee Brewers
 CJ Watson, former NBA player

 Dana White, President of the UFC

Notable staff

 Mike Carter (born 1955), American-Israeli basketball player, Bishop Gorman basketball coach
 Tim Chambers, baseball coach: Bishop Gorman (1991–1999), UNLV (2011–2015)
 Tony Sanchez: football coach: Bishop Gorman (2009-2014), UNLV Rebels Football (2015-2019)

References

Catholic secondary schools in Nevada
Educational institutions established in 1954
High schools in Clark County, Nevada
Schools accredited by the Northwest Accreditation Commission
Buildings and structures in Summerlin, Nevada
School buildings completed in 2007
1954 establishments in Nevada
Roman Catholic Diocese of Las Vegas